Marcus Tucker (born June 24, 1992) is a free agent American football wide receiver. He played college football at Northern Michigan and signed with the Pittsburgh Steelers as an undrafted free agent in 2016.

Professional career

Pittsburgh Steelers 
Tucker signed with the Pittsburgh Steelers as an undrafted free agent on May 9, 2016. During the 2016 preseason, Tucker caught three passes for 23 yards. He was waived by the Steelers on September 3, 2016. On November 8, 2016, he was signed to the Steelers' practice squad. He signed a reserve/future contract with the Steelers on January 24, 2017.

On September 2, 2017, Tucker was waived by the Steelers, and was then signed to the practice squad the next day. He signed a reserve/future contract with the Steelers on January 16, 2018.

On September 1, 2018, Tucker was waived by the Steelers.

Hamilton Tiger-Cats
Tucker re-signed with the Hamilton Tiger-Cats on January 2, 2021.

References

External links
Northern Michigan Wildcats bio

1992 births
Living people
American football wide receivers
Northern Michigan Wildcats football players
Pittsburgh Steelers players
Players of American football from Flint, Michigan
Sportspeople from Flint, Michigan
Hamilton Tiger-Cats players
Canadian football wide receivers
American players of Canadian football